The 2017 WCHA Men's Ice Hockey Tournament was played between March 3 and March 18, 2017, on campus locations. By winning the tournament, Michigan Tech was awarded the Broadmoor Trophy and received the WCHA's automatic bid to the 2017 NCAA Division I Men's Ice Hockey Tournament.

Format
The first two rounds of the postseason tournament features a best-of-three games format. The top eight conference teams participate in the tournament. Teams are seeded No. 1 through No. 8 according to their final conference standing, with a tiebreaker system used to seed teams with an identical number of points accumulated. The higher seeded teams each earn home ice and host one of the lower seeded teams.

The final was a single game held at the campus site of the highest remaining seed.

Conference standings
Note: GP = Games played; W = Wins; L = Losses; T = Ties; PTS = Points; GF = Goals For; GA = Goals Against

Bracket
Teams are reseeded after the first round

Note: * denotes overtime periods

Results

Quarterfinals

(1) Bemidji State vs. (8) Northern Michigan

(2) Michigan Tech vs. (7) Lake Superior State

(3) Minnesota State vs. (6) Alaska

(4) Bowling Green vs. (5) Ferris State

Semifinals

(1) Bemidji State vs. (4) Bowling Green

(2) Michigan Tech vs. (3) Minnesota State

Championship

(2) Michigan Tech vs. (4) Bowling Green

Tournament awards

Most Outstanding Player
Shane Hanna (Michigan Tech)

References

WCHA Men's Ice Hockey Tournament
WCHA Men's Ice Hockey Tournament
Ice hockey competitions in Michigan
College sports tournaments in Michigan
WCHA Men's Ice Hockey Tournament
Houghton, Michigan